Marco Caldera (born 1963) is a former Italian slalom canoeist who competed from the mid-1980s to the mid-1990s. He won a silver medal in the K-1 team event at the 1989 ICF Canoe Slalom World Championships in Savage River.

References

External links 
 Marco CALDERA at CanoeSlalom.net

Living people
Italian male canoeists
1963 births
Medalists at the ICF Canoe Slalom World Championships
20th-century Italian people